Patrícia Comini-Ribeiro da Silva (born March 8, 1975 in Americana) is a former breaststroke and butterfly swimmer from Brazil.

International career

At the 1995 Pan American Games in Mar del Plata, Comini won a bronze medal in the 4×100-metre medley. She also finished 4th in the 200-metre butterfly, and 8th in the 100-metre butterfly.

On December 20, 1998, she broke the short-course Brazilian record in the 100-metre breaststroke, with a time of 1:10.59.

At the 1999 Pan American Games in Winnipeg, Comini won a bronze medal in the 4×100-metre medley. She also finished 5th in the 200-metre butterfly, 6th in the 100-metre breaststroke, and 7th in the 200-metre breaststroke.

On November 21, 1999, she broke the short-course South American record in the 50-metre breaststroke, with a time of 32.36 seconds.

On December 17, 1999, she broke the long-course South American record in the 50-metre breaststroke, with a time of 32.96 seconds.

On June 11, 2000, she broke the long-course Brazilian record in the 100-metre breaststroke, with a time of 1:12.47.

Participating in the 2003 World Aquatics Championships, in Barcelona, she finished 14th in the 4×100-metre medley, 38th in the 50-metre breaststroke, and 42nd in the 100-metre breaststroke.

At the 2003 Pan American Games in Santo Domingo, Dominican Republic, Comini finished 4th in the 4×100-metre medley, 8th in the 100-metre breaststroke, and 10th in the 200-metre breaststroke.

She retired from professional swimming in 2005.

Personal bests

Patrícia Comini is the former holder of the following records:

Long Course (50 meters):

 Former South American record holder of the 50 m breaststroke: 32.96, time obtained on December 17, 1999 
 Former Brazilian record holder of the 100 m breaststroke: 1:12.47 time obtained on June 11, 2000

Short course (25 meters):

 Former South American record holder of the 50 m breaststroke: 32.36, time obtained on November 21, 1999 
 Former Brazilian record holder of the 100 m breaststroke: 1:10.59, time obtained on December 20, 1998

References

1975 births
Living people
Brazilian female breaststroke swimmers
Brazilian female butterfly swimmers
Swimmers at the 1995 Pan American Games
Swimmers at the 1999 Pan American Games
Swimmers at the 2003 Pan American Games
Pan American Games bronze medalists for Brazil
Pan American Games medalists in swimming
Medalists at the 1995 Pan American Games
Medalists at the 1999 Pan American Games
Sportspeople from São Paulo (state)
20th-century Brazilian women
21st-century Brazilian women